The Ch'ŏlsan Line is a non-electrified standard-gauge freight-only secondary line of the Korean State Railway in North P'yŏngan Province, North Korea, running from Tongrim on the P'yŏngŭi Line to Tongch'angri, where it serves the Sŏhae Satellite Launching Station.

History
The Ch'ŏlsan Line was originally opened as the Tongch'ŏn Line by the Chosen Government Railway prior to 1937, running  from Ch'aryŏngwan (nowadays called Tongrim) on the Kyŏngui Line to Tongch'ŏn (now called Ch'ŏlsan). To facilitate the construction of the Sŏhae Satellite Launching Station, the line was extended around 2010 to the launch facility via Tongch'ang.

Route
A yellow background in the "Distance" box indicates that section of the line is not electrified.

References

Railway lines in North Korea
Standard gauge railways in North Korea